Sex is the debut studio EP by American recording artist Tila Tequila. It was released on March 20, 2007 by the Washington-based label The Saturday Team. Released shortly after her debut single, "I Love U", the EP was allegedly not authorized for release by Tequila, which led The Saturday Team and distributor Icon Music Entertainment Services to sue her over breaching her contract related to the album. The Saturday Team won the legal case and made Sex available for digital download on September 22, 2008 via iTunes Store.

Composition
Sex is an electronic pop rock record, which also contains elements of other genres such as punk rock, new wave and classical music. Tequila wrote most of the songs from the perspective of her alter ego Jane.

The EP opens with a new-age world music introduction which transitions into an electric guitar instrumental. The second track, "Sex", is an electronic rock song with elements of classical music. "Little Brat" is a punk rock new wave song. Lyrically, it is about "a little rich girl that lives off her daddy's money". The fourth song, "Rat Room", is about fighting with her alter ego Jane, who wants to "destroy everything she has made". Tequila sings: "Eyes shut she just won't go away/Get help that's what my friends would say/But I can't I will just let her be/Because Jane is actually only me".

Critical response

Upon its release, Sex received mixed to negative reviews from critics. Stephen Thomas Erlewine at AllMusic gave it only one star out of five, mostly criticizing its production. He remarked that "she's not trashy enough to be a guilty pleasure and she's not bad enough to be memorable, she's just boring".

Track listing

Credits and personnel
Tila Tequila – vocals, songwriter
Claire Ejanda – artwork
Misha – photography

Release history

References

External links
[ Sex] at AllMusic

2007 debut EPs
Tila Tequila albums